Shittim may mean several different things:

Botany
Shittim, the plural of Shittah, which is Hebrew for wood from the acacia tree, which appears in the Bible

Places
Abel-Shittim, Ha-Shittim, or simply Shittim, later Abila (Peraea), a place that appears in the Bible
Shitim, a village in southern Israel